Hamilton Bike Share (previously known as Social Bicycles Hamilton or SoBi Hamilton) is a bicycle sharing system located in Hamilton, Ontario, Canada.  It consists of 825 bicycles at 129 hubs located in the Downtown, Westdale, and Dundas areas of the city.

The system has been operated by Hamilton Bike Share Inc, a local non-profit corporation, using equipment developed by New York-based Social Bicycles Inc.

Due to financial problems, the system closed down on June 1, 2020, but it has since reopened.

History
In December 2013, the City of Hamilton approved the implementation of a bicycle share system, with start-up costs covered by a $1.6 million grant from Metrolinx. The system officially launched on March 20, 2015, though a limited system of 200 bicycles had already been operating since January 2015. The service has been terminated, effective June 1, 2020.

An expansion completed in late 2017, "Everyone Rides Initiative", added 12 more hubs, 75 more bikes, and a new system of discounted memberships for low-income residents. In June 2019, the firm added a tricycle to its fleet.

In 2020 Uber backed out of their contract with the City of Hamilton, despite being under contract through February 2021. On May 28, after 14 hours in session, Hamilton city council decided to store all the bikes and equipment instead of funding the system's continued operation. Later on, the system reopened.

References

External links
 

Community bicycle programs
Transport in Hamilton, Ontario
2015 establishments in Ontario
Bicycle sharing in Canada